Rennie Curran (born November 10, 1988) is a keynote speaker, leadership coach, author and former American football linebacker. He played college football at the University of Georgia. Curran was considered one of the top weakside linebackers of his class, and has been called "the most dominant defensive player in the game" by The Sporting News.  In January 2010, Curran announced that he was forgoing his final year of eligibility to enter the 2010 NFL Draft. He was the 97th pick in the 2010 NFL Draft by the Titans.

High school career
Curran attended Brookwood High School in Snellville, Georgia, where he became the Broncos’ all-time leading tackler and was twice named Gwinnett County Touchdown Club Defensive Player of the Year. He was named to the Atlanta Journal-Constitution Super Southern 100 and Class AAAAA First-team Defense.

Considered a four-star recruit by Rivals.com, Curran was listed as the No. 11 inside linebacker prospect in the nation.

College career
As a true freshman in 2007, Curran appeared in 11 games making five starts with 53 tackles including 9 for loss and 3 quarterback sacks. He received Freshman First-team All-America honors by Rivals.com, and Honorable Mention by The Sporting News.

In his sophomore season, Curran started all 13 games leading the team in tackles (115), including a team-leading 10 for a loss and a team-high 3 sacks to go along with two forced fumbles. His 115 tackles were the most by a Bulldog since Orantes Grant recorded 120 in 1998. Curran was a finalist for the Butkus Award and earned Sophomore All-American honors by College Football News.

In 2009, his junior season, he was voted First-team All-SEC by the AP and Coaches, and was also named First-team All-America by CBSSports.com after leading the SEC in tackles with 116.

Professional career

Tennessee Titans
The Tennessee Titans selected Rennie Curran with the 97th pick of the 2010 NFL Draft. He was given the number 53, the number of fan-favorite Keith Bulluck, a linebacker who was released earlier in the year. He was released on September 2, 2011.

Tampa-Bay Buccaneers
Curran spent some time as a member of the Tampa Bay Buccaners of the National Football League during the 2012 NFL season, but did not see any playing time

Edmonton Eskimos
Curran joined the Edmonton Eskimos of the Canadian Football League in time for the 2013 CFL season; of which he played in 16 of the 18 regular season games. In his first season in the CFL he amassed 70 tackles, 10 special teams tackles, 2 sacks and 2 interceptions; one of which was for a defensive touchdown. Curran had 53 defensive tackles and 7 special teams tackles in the 2014 CFL season. He was not resigned by the Eskimos prior to the start of CFL free-agency on February 10, 2015, and thus was a free agent.

BC Lions
On September 22, 2015, it was announced that Curran had signed with the BC Lions.

He participated in The Spring League in 2017 with hopes of returning to the NFL, but suffered a career-ending patella tendon injury.

Personal life 
Curran became the author of his first book "Free Agent" - The Perspectives of A Young African American Athlete on April 4, 2012. The book was published by Rathsi Publishing and the foreword was written by University of Georgia head coach Mark Richt. He is a public speaker and has spoken to a wide variety of organizations including schools, churches, and corporate businesses. He began playing the piano at the age of eight, the drums at the age of ten, and the viola at the age of thirteen.

References

External links
 Rennie Curran Website
 BC Lions bio 
 Edmonton Eskimos bio 
 ESPN NFL Draft profile
 "Free Agent" by Rennie curran 

1988 births
Living people
American football linebackers
Canadian football linebackers
African-American players of American football
African-American players of Canadian football
Georgia Bulldogs football players
People from Snellville, Georgia
Players of American football from Georgia (U.S. state)
Tennessee Titans players
BC Lions players
The Spring League players
Tampa Bay Buccaneers players
Edmonton Elks players
21st-century African-American sportspeople
20th-century African-American people